Georgia competed at the 2022 World Aquatics Championships in Budapest, Hungary from 17 June to 3 July.

Diving

Georgia's diving team consisted of 3 athletes (3 male).

Men

Swimming

Georgia entered two swimmers.

Men

Water polo

Summary

Men's tournament

Team roster

Group play

Playoffs

9–12th place semifinals

Ninth place game

References

Nations at the 2022 World Aquatics Championships
Georgia (country) at the World Aquatics Championships
2022 in Georgian sport